Jenny Elbe (born 18 April 1990) is a German athlete specialising in the triple jump. She represented her country at several major international competitions making the final at the 2013 European Indoor Championships and 2014 European Championships.

Born in Karl-Marx-Stadt, East Germany, Elbe's personal bests in the event are 14.28 metres outdoors (+1.4 m/s Dresden 2016) and 14.27 metres (Belgrade 2017).

Competition record

References

Living people
1990 births
Sportspeople from Chemnitz
German female triple jumpers
Athletes (track and field) at the 2016 Summer Olympics
Olympic athletes of Germany
Universiade medalists in athletics (track and field)
Universiade silver medalists for Germany
Medalists at the 2015 Summer Universiade
Competitors at the 2011 Summer Universiade